The Lennox House is a house in Colorado Springs, Colorado on the National Register of Historic Places. It was added to the Colorado State Register of Historic Properties on August 11, 1999. It was built in 1900 by William Lennox and added to the National Register of Historic Places on October 21, 1999. It is private because it is residential. Added to the Colorado College campus in 1936, it served as the Student Union from 1937 to 1959.

References

Houses completed in 1900
Houses on the National Register of Historic Places in Colorado
Colorado State Register of Historic Properties
Buildings and structures in Colorado Springs, Colorado
Houses in El Paso County, Colorado
National Register of Historic Places in Colorado Springs, Colorado